"Betcha Say That" is a song from 1987 performed by Gloria Estefan and Miami Sound Machine from their 1987 album, Let It Loose. It was written by Larry Dermer, Joe Galdo and Rafael Vigil.

Released as the second single from Let It Loose, "Betcha Say That" was not among Estefan's bigger hits of the 1980s, peaking at #36 on the Billboard Hot 100 chart in October 1987. It was more successful on the Billboard adult contemporary chart, where the song reached #19. In the UK, the single was released in September 1987 and like the previous release of Rhythm Is Gonna Get You, it failed to chart.

In the US, a single remix was released on 7", and an extended remix was released on a 12" single.

The song was not selected for inclusion on the singer's 1992 greatest hits album.

Formats and track listings

Official versions and remixes
Original versions
 Album Version — (4:36)

Pablo Flores remixes
 Single Remix — (3:40)
 12" Version (aka Extended Version) — (7:20)
 Dub Version  — (6:16)

Release history

Charts

References

External links
12" release info from discogs.com

1987 singles
Gloria Estefan songs
Songs written by Gloria Estefan
Song recordings produced by Emilio Estefan
1987 songs
Epic Records singles